Douglas Malcolm Fraser  (born April 16, 1950), is a United States Air Force (USAF) general who served as the Commander, United States Southern Command (USSOUTHCOM). He was the first USAF officer to become USSOUTHCOM's combatant commander. He previously served as Deputy Commander, United States Pacific Command from April 2008 to June 24, 2009. He assumed his final assignment on June 25, 2009.

Military career 
General Fraser earned his commission upon graduation from the United States Air Force Academy in 1975. A qualified Command Pilot in fighter aircraft, his operational assignments include Europe, the Pacific, Air Combat Command and Air Force Space Command.  He has previously served as Commander, Space Warfare Center, Schriever Air Force Base, Colorado; as well as Commander, Alaskan Command, United States Pacific Command; Commander, 11th Air Force, Pacific Air Forces; and Commander, Alaskan North American Defense Region, with headquarters at Elmendorf Air Force Base, Alaska.

Education

Assignments 
August 1975 - July 1976, student, undergraduate pilot training, Vance Air Force Base, Oklahoma
September 1976 - March 1977, F-15 student, 405th Tactical Training Unit, Luke Air Force Base, Arizona
June 1977 - May 1980, F-15 pilot, 36th Tactical Fighter Wing, Bitburg Air Base, West Germany
June 1980 - June 1983, F-15 squadron weapons officer, 405th Tactical Training Wing, Luke Air Force Base, Arizona
July 1983 - June 1985, flight commander, 49th Tactical Fighter Wing, Holloman Air Force Base, New Mexico
July 1985 - July 1986, aide to the Commander, 12th Air Force, Bergstrom Air Force Base, Texas
August 1986 - June 1987, student, Air Command and Staff College, Maxwell Air Force Base, Alabama
July 1987 - July 1989, fighter programmer, Directorate of Programs and Resources, Headquarters United States Air Force, Washington, D.C.
July 1989 - May 1991, member, Chief of Staff of the Air Force Staff Group, Headquarters United States Air Force, Washington, D.C.
July 1991 - June 1992, Commander, Weapons and Tactics Flight, 18th Operations Support Squadron, Kadena Air Base, Japan
June 1992 - October 1992, Director of Operations, 44th Fighter Squadron, Kadena Air Base, Japan
October 1992 - July 1993, Commander, 12th Fighter Squadron, Kadena Air Base, Japan
August 1993 - June 1994, student, National War College, Fort Lesley J. McNair, Washington, D.C.
July 1994 - July 1996, analysis assistant, Office of Assistant Secretary of Defense for Strategy and Requirements, Washington, D.C.
July 1996 - June 1997, Director, Chief of Staff of the Air Force Operations Group, Headquarters U.S. Air Force, Washington, D.C.
July 1997 - January 1999, Commander, 366th Operations Group, Mountain Home Air Force Base, Idaho
February 1999 - January 2000, executive assistant to the Commander in Chief, United States Pacific Command, Camp H.M. Smith, Hawaii
January 2000 - April 2002, Commander, 3d Wing, Elmendorf Air Force Base, Alaska
April 2002 - June 2003, Commander, Space Warfare Center, Air Force Space Command, Schriever Air Force Base, Colorado
May 2003 - October 2005, Director of Air and Space Operations, Headquarters Air Force Space Command, Peterson Air Force Base, Colorado
October 2005 - April 2008, Commander, Alaskan Command, United States Pacific Command; Commander, 11th Air Force, Pacific Air Forces; and Commander, Alaskan North American Defense Region, Elmendorf Air Force Base, Alaska
April 2008 - June 2009, Deputy Commander, United States Pacific Command, Camp H.M. Smith, Hawaii
June 2009 - November 2012, Commander, United States Southern Command, Miami, Florida

Flight information

Awards and decorations

Other foreign awards

Effective dates of promotion

Succession 

  

1953 births
Living people
United States Air Force personnel of the Gulf War
Recipients of the Legion of Merit
United States Air Force Academy alumni
United States Air Force generals
Recipients of the Defense Superior Service Medal
Recipients of the Defense Distinguished Service Medal
Recipients of the Air Force Distinguished Service Medal
Harvard Kennedy School alumni